The Faculty of Law of Paris, called from the late 1950s to 1970 the Faculty of Law and Economics of Paris, is the second-oldest faculty of law in the world and one of the four and eventually five faculties of the University of Paris ("the Sorbonne"), from the 12th century until 1970. 

During the Middle Ages, it was, with the faculty of law of the University of Bologna, the oldest one, one of the two most important faculties of law in the world. Pierre Abélard, founder of modern law, was its precursor, as a teacher at the cathedral school of Notre-Dame de Paris, Andrea Alciato, founder of legal humanism, was a professor there, and Saint Ivo, patron of lawyers and "Advocate of the Poor" according to the Catholic Church, had studied there. The prohibition by the Pope of teaching of Roman Law limited, however, its growth, to the benefit of the nearby University of Orléans, where numerous important French people studied law. In 1679, King Louis authorized the teaching of Roman Law. Numerous French intellectuals and revolutionary, like Voltaire, Diderot and d'Alembert, Robespierre, etc. studied there. Between the French Revolution and its dissolution in 1970, numerous important people in France and in the world taught or studied there, including Victor Hugo, Claude Lévi-Strauss, Tocqueville, and Honoré de Balzac. The faculty of law is also mentioned in classical French literature, in particular in Les Misérables.

At the dissolution of the Sorbonne in 1970, its two main buildings were place du Panthéon and rue d’Assas. Most of its law professors (88 out of 108) decided to perpetuate the faculty of law and economics by creating and joining a university of law offering the same programs within the same two buildings; therefore, they created the "University of Law, Economics and Social Sciences of Paris", now called Panthéon-Assas University. Likewise, most of the economics professors (35 out of 41) preferred to found the multidisciplinary Paris 1 Panthéon-Sorbonne University with professors of the faculty of humanities of Paris and a few professors of law.

History

c. 1100 – 1223: Law School of Paris 

Pierre Abélard, teacher at the great cathedral school of Notre-Dame de Paris (that would eventually become the Sorbonne), writing with the influence of his wife Héloïse, stressed that subjective intention determines the moral value of human action and therefore that the legal consequence of an action is related to the person that commits it and not merely to the action. With this doctrine, Abelard created in the Middle Ages the idea of the individual subject central to modern law. This gave to School of Notre-Dame de Paris (later the University of Paris) a recognition of its expertise in the area of Law, even before the faculty of Law existed and the school even recognized as an "universitas" and even if Abelard was primarily a logician and a theologian. The law grew afterwards to be a discipline in its own rights (rather than only a subject within theology and philosophy), and a faculty of law was founded.

1223–1679: Faculty of Canon Law 
The Pope forbade Roman law in Paris in 1223 with the decretal Super Specula. Afterwards, the Paris Law Faculty was called "Faculté de décret" or "Consultissima decretorum facultas", meaning Faculty of Canon Law. 

During this period, people who wanted to learn civil law (Roman Law) and become lawyers would usually go to the nearby faculty of law of the University of Orléans. Hence, Molière, Calvin, Perrault, Cujas, Rabelais, Fermat, La Boétie and others went to this faculty.

1679–1793: Faculty of civil and canon law 

After the Edict of Saint-Germain of April 1679 by Louis XIV reestablished the teaching of Roman law in Paris, the faculty was known as the "faculty of civil and canon law". It was closed alongside other faculties on September 15, 1793, during the French Revolution.

Louis XIV reformed the programs of the faculty of Law of Paris, also introducing French Customary Law.

1802–1970: Faculty of Law of Paris 

In 1802, the faculty of law was re-opened, and was called "the School of Law of Paris" (l'École de droit de Paris). In 1896, the law faculty and the henceforth four other Parisian faculties were grouped together to recreate the University of Paris. In the late 1950s, it became a "faculty of law and economics".

The Code Civil was taught after its creation in 1804. The programs were reformed at the end of the 19th century.

Originally, the faculty of law was not organized around research centers and professors were pursuing their research as part of faculty of law in general. Hence, only newly emerging fields of research would have newly created institutes, whereas traditional subjects such as Roman Law and Legal History, Private Law in general and Public law in general, would not necessarily have ones. 

"Doctorate courses" existed in legal studies at that time until they were replaced in 1925 by the "Diplôme d’études supérieures". The Decree of the 2 May 1925 created in each faculty of Law 4 DES: DES in Roman Law and Legal history, DES in Private Law, DES in public Law and DES in Politics and Economics. It required students to obtain two of them undergraduate studies to be able to begin a doctorate (PhD). In 1964, the undergraduate studies took 4 years (4-year licence, and eventually 3-year licence and a one-year maîtrise) and only one DES was necessary to begin a doctorate. 2 additional DES are created in each faculty: DES in Criminal Law and Politics and Economics are separated in two DES.

1970: Dissolution 

Following the events of May 1968, the faculties of the University of Paris became independent universities 

Most law professors (88 out of 108) decided to perpetuate the faculty of law and economics within the same two buiildings (Panthéon and Assas). Therefore, they created the "University of Law, Economics and social sciences of Paris" (Université de droit, d'économie et de sciences sociales de Paris), administratively shortened as Paris II, and currently named University of Paris II Panthéon-Assas, which is therefore considered as its direct inheritor.  Paris 2 inherited the teaching programs and research centers from the Faculty of Law. Some joined interdisciplinary universities in Paris, like Panthéon-Sorbonne University, Paris Descartes University, Paris-Est Créteil University (these names were formed later), or outside Paris.

Likewise, most of its professors in economics (35 out of 41) preferred to join the multidisciplinary university, Paris I, later called Pantheon-Sorbonne University while others joined University of Paris II Panthéon-Assas, Paris-Dauphine University, Paris Descartes University and Paris-Est Créteil University.

Campuses 

In 1680, Louis XIV decided to place the faculty of law at the Royal College.

In 1753, Louis XV decided that a new building would be constructed for the faculty of law on the place du Panthéon. Jacques-Germain Soufflot, alumnus of the faculty who had become the architect of the King designed and supervised the construction. It took place from 1771 to 1773 and the new building opened in 1774.

In the 1950s, a new building was constructed rue d'Assas in Paris. It was designed by Charles Lemaresquier, Alain le Normand and François Carpentier to accommodate the growing number of students at the University of Paris. It was built between 1959 and 1963 on the former grounds of Société Marinoni. At the time of its inauguration, its main lecture theatre was the largest in France, with 1,700 seats

Notable faculty

1100–1679 
Andrea Alciato, founder of legal humanism

1679–1793 
Mathieu-Antoine Bouchaud, author of the French Enlightenment and professor of law at the Paris Law Faculty

19th century 

Francois Denis Tronchet, president of the commission for the creation of the French Civil Code and lawyer of Louis XVI of France at his trial (with Malesherbes and Deseze) 
Claude-Étienne Delvincourt, also mentioned by Victor Hugo in Les Misérables as professor of Marius Pontmercy
Joseph Louis Elzéar Ortolan
Paul Gide and Charles Gide, father and uncle of André Gide, Nobel Prize in Literature 1947
Gustave Boissonade, builder of the Japanese Civil Law during the Meiji Era
Émile Acollas, one of the founders of the League of Peace and Freedom
Louis Renault

20th century 

Gaston Jèze, French academic, humanitarian and human rights activist (including during WW2)
André Weiss
Boris Mirkin-Getzevich
René Cassin, known for co-authoring the Universal Declaration of Human Rights, receiving the Nobel Peace Prize, soldier during WW2
Georges Ripert
Henri Mazeaud (1939–1971, later professor emeritus from Paris II), twin brother of Léon Mazeaud, resistant to Nazi Germany and deported to Buchenwald
Léon Mazeaud, (1941–1970), twin brother of Henri Mazeaud, resistant to Nazi Germany and deported to Buchenwald, dead in a hiking accident
René Capitant, minister of Justice after WW2
René David (1945–1968, went in 1968 to Aix-Marseille University until 1976), one of the most prominent professors of comparative law in the world in the 20th century, honorary degrees from the University of Edinburgh, Brussels, Ottawa, Basel, Leicester and Helsinki, recipient of the Amnesty International's Erasmus Prize in 1976.
Suzanne Bastid  (1947–1977, Paris II from 1971) was the first woman professor of Law of France, the first woman to be a member of the Académie des sciences morales et politiques Secretary General of the Institute of International Law (Nobel prize 1904).
Georges Vedel (1949–1979, Paris II from 1971), former member of the Constitutional Council of France
Jean Carbonnier (1955–1976, Paris II from 1971), one of the most famous French professors in Law of the 20th Century.
Gérard Cornu (born 1967, Paris II from 1971), who wrote the new French Code of Civil Procedure in the late 1970s and is also well known in France for his Dictionary of Legal Vocabulary, translated in English.
François Terré (1969–1999, Paris II from 1971), president in 2008 of the legal section of the Académie des sciences morales et politiques, head of the private committee for the reform of French Law of Obligations.
Jacques Robert (1969–1979, Paris II from 1971), former member of the Constitutional Council of France

Notable alumni (1100–1679) 

The Pope forbade the teaching of Roman law in Paris in 1223 with the decretal Super Specula. Until the reintroduction of Roman Law (civil law) by Louis XIV, people who wanted to learn civil law (Roman Law) and become lawyers would usually go to the nearby faculty of Law of the University of Orléans. Hence, Molière, Calvin, Perrault, Cujas, Rabelais, Fermat, La Boétie and others went to the latter.

Saint Ivo, patron of the lawyers of abandoned children, and of Brittany, "Advocate of the Poor"
Nicolas Boileau, one of the builders of French poetry
Julius Caesar, Chancellor of the Exchequer
Nicolas Fouquet, Superintendent of Finances under King Louis XIV
Alain-René Lesage, author of Gil Blas

Notable alumni (1679–1793) 

Voltaire
Mathieu-Antoine Bouchaud, author of the French Enlightenment
Jean le Rond d'Alembert, co-creator with Diderot of the Encyclopédie (creating the concept of encyclopedia)
Denis Diderot, co-creator with d'Alembert of the Encyclopédie
Étienne Pascal, father and instructor of Blaise Pascal
Maximilien Robespierre, prominent member of the French Revolution
Camille Desmoulins, member of the French Revolution

Notable alumni (1802–1970)

Intellectuals 

Victor Hugo
Alexis de Tocqueville

Law professors 

Manuel Alejandro Álvarez Jofré, Chilean professor of international law and a judge at the International Court of Justice
Henri Batiffol
Raymond Carré de Malberg
Lev Kasso, Russian professor of law and secretary of public instruction
Gustave Boissonade

Judiciary and lawyers 

Lawyers who are more well known as politicians are listed in the section about politicians.

Sarmiza Bilcescu, first female student in law in France and first female doctor of law in France
Jeanne Chauvin, first woman to lead at the bar in France
Henri Donnedieu de Vabres, French judge at the Nuremberg trials
Louis Henri Barboux, lawyer for Sarah Bernhardt in her 1880 breach-of-contract suit against the Comédie-Française
Louis Leblois, magistrate and lawyer of Alfred Dreyfus, symbolic French antisemitism case
Fernand Labori, lawyer of Alfred Dreyfus
Paul Magnaud, prominent magistrate
Rodolphe-Madeleine Cleophas Dareste de La Chavanne
Mireille Ndiaye
Olga Petit, first woman to take the oath to become barrister in France
Simone Rozès, first female president of the French Court of Cassation (highest position for a judge in France)
Jacques Vergès, prominent French lawyer
Tcheng Yu-hsiu, first female lawyer and judge in Chinese history

Literature, arts and social activism 

Honoré de Balzac, prominent author
René Bazin, prominent author
Gustave Flaubert, author of Madame Bovary
Marcel Proust, author of In Search of Lost Time
Anne Ancelin Schützenberger, psychologist
Jean Aubert, engineer
Jacques Bainville, journalist and historian
Alfred Binet, psychologist
Henri Burin des Roziers, priest and social activist
Charles Champoiseau, archeologist
Éric de Dampierre, ethnologist
 Émile Dard, historian
Henri de Gaulle, teacher, father of Charles de Gaulle (president of France)
Gaëtan Duval, activist
Dariush Safvat, music master
Raphaël Salem, Raphaël Salem, Greek mathematician whose name gave the Salem numbers, the Salem–Spencer sets and the Salem Prize
Claude Lévi-Strauss, "father of modern anthropology"

Politics and military

France: presidents 
François Mitterrand, president for 14 years
Jean Casimir-Perier, president and prime minister, involved in the Dreyfus affair against antisemitism
Raymond Poincaré, president during World War I and prime minister

France: prime ministers 
Aristide Briand, prime minister, Nobel Peace Prize 1926
Léon Gambetta, prime minister, influential during the Franco-Prussian War and in the restoration of the Republic in France
Jules Grévy, prime minister
Michel Debré, prime minister
Pierre Messmer, prime minister
Maurice Couve de Murville, prime minister
Henri Brisson, prime minister
Maurice Bourgès-Maunoury, prime minister
Léon Bourgeois, prime minister

France: other 
Jules Favre, opponent to Napoleon III
Robert Badinter, minister of justice
Gustave Rouland
Simone Veil, minister of justice
Pierre-Antoine Berryer, member of parliament and the Académie française
Bernard Barberon, resistant to Nazi Germany
Jean-Baptiste Biaggi, resistant and member of parliament
Guy de Boysson, resistant
Lucien Brun, prominent member of parliament of the French Third Republic
Pierre Jacobsen, resistant and high-rank military
Jean-Marie Le Pen, member of parliament

Outside of France 
Javad Ameri, Iranian minister of Interior
Ali Amini, Prime Minister of Iran
Constantin Argetoianu, prime minister of Romania
Shapour Bakhtiar, last prime minister of Iran before the Islamic Republic, voluntary soldier during WW2 to help France, opponent to monarchy, to clerical rule and to the communists, assassinated in France by agents of the Islamic Republic in 1991
Hassen Belkhodja, Tunisian secretary of state
Habib Bourguiba Jr., Tunisian politician, son of Habib Bourguiba
Boutros Boutros-Ghali, sixth secretary-general of the United Nations (UN)
Armand Călinescu, prime minister of Romania
Hasan Dosti, Albanian nationalist
Abbas Ali Khalatbari, Iranian secretary of foreign affairs
Gheorghe Mironescu
Vũ Văn Mẫu, Minister of Foreign Affairs of the Republic of Vietnam and Prime Minister of the Republic of Vietnam
Wei Tao-ming, Republic of China's ambassador to the United States during the Second World War

Fictional 

Marius Pontmercy, from Les Misérables

Deans
 1417- : Raoul Roussel
 Charles Giraud
 1805-1809 : Louis-François Portiez
 1809-1830 : Claude-Étienne Delvincourt
 1830-1843 : Hyacinthe Blondeau
 1843-1845 : Pellegrino Rossi
 1845-1846 : Jacques Berriat-Saint-Prix
 1846-1847 : Albert-Paul Royer-Collard
 1847-1868 : Charles Auguste Pellat
 1868-1879 : Gabriel Frédéric Colmet-Daâge
 1879-1887 : Charles Beudant
 1887-1896 : Edmond Colmet de Santerre
 1896-1899 : Eugène Garsonnet
 1899-1906 : Ernest Désiré Glasson
 1906-1910 : Charles Lyon-Caen
 1910-1913 : Paul Cauwès]
 1913-1922 : Ferdinand Larnaude
 1922-1933 : Henry Berthélemy
 1933-1938 : Edgard Allix
 1937-1944 : Georges Ripert
 1944-1955 : Léon Julliot de La Morandière
 1962-1967 : Georges Vedel
 1967-1970 : Alain Barrère

References

Sources

.

External links
L’histoire de la Faculté de Droit de Paris (v. 1100-1970), detailed history of the Faculty of Law of Paris (and from the teaching of law from the 4th Century BC in Celtic Gauls)
Pictures of the Faculty of Law of Paris in the early 20th century, from the Bibliothèque interuniversitaire de la Sorbonne.
Pictures of the Faculty of Law of Paris between 1880 and 1945, from the Paris public library.

Further reading

University of Paris
Legal history of France
Law schools in France